Fernando Pérez may refer to:
Fernando Pérez de Traba (c. 1090–c. 1155), medieval statesman
Fernán Pérez de Guzmán (1376–1458), Spanish historian and poet
Fernando Pérez de Almazán, Spanish emissary and Governor of Texas, 1722–1727
Fernando Perez (baseball) (born 1983), American baseball outfielder
Fernando Pérez (director) (born 1944), Cuban film director
Fernando Néstor Pérez (born 1980), Argentine footballer
Fernando Pérez (software developer), Creator of the IPython and Jupyter projects